Stella Novarino, known professionally as Stella Jean (born 1979), is an Italian fashion designer of partial Haitian origin. She is a member of the Italian Chamber of Fashion and the only member of Afro-European background.<ref>{{Cite web|date=August 17, 2020|title=Black Creatives in Italian Fashion Demand Cultural Reform |url=https://www.voanews.com/europe/black-creatives-italian-fashion-demand-cultural-reform|access-date=2020-08-18|website=VOA News|language=en-US|quote=The only Black designer belonging to Italy's influential fashion council is demanding a "long overdue cultural reform}}</ref> Living and working in Rome, Jean is considered to be Giorgio Armani's protégé.

The basis of Jean's work is multiculturalism applied to fashion, resulting in a cultural fusion of her own métisse identity. Her work often merges classical Italian tailoring with stylistic features of varying cultures. Stella Jean created the business model and sustainable development platform: "Laboratorio delle Nazioni". In 2019 she was highlighted by the New York Times as the most convincing of all the New Gen designers in Milan.

Early years
Jean was born and raised in Rome to a Haitian mother, Violette Jean, and an Italian father, Marcello Novarino. She studied political science at Sapienza University of Rome, before dropping out to model for Egon von Fürstenberg, fashion designer and ex-husband of Diane von Fürstenberg. It is here where she realized that she would rather make the clothes than wear them.

Career
Jean began receiving attention at Vogue Italia’s "Who Is On Next" contest in 2011 when she won second place. When making her fashion brand, she decided to use her mothers maiden name Jean, instead of her birth surname Novarino.

In 2013, Giorgio Armani asked her to showcase her designs in the Armani/Teatro space during Milano Moda Donna for Fashion Week SS14. For Jean's spring/summer 2014 collection, she collaborated with the International Trade Centre's Ethical Fashion Initiative. As a result, the printed fabrics for this collection were sustainably sourced, hand-crafted and aimed at helping trade workers in disadvantaged communities in Africa. She also collaborated on shoes with Christian Louboutin for her AW14 collection, which featured her first menswear collection.

In April 2014 she was selected by the Victoria and Albert Museum in London to exhibit several outfits in its Glamour of Italian Fashion 1945-2014 exhibition.

Stella attended as a speaker on the “Power of Empowered Women” discussion panel at the Palace of Nations and, on the same day, presented her garments created in collaboration with the United Nations ethical fashion program at the World Trade Organization (WTO). She also participated in the Global Fashion Capitals exposition at the FIT Museum in New York, exhibiting one of her Autumn | Winter 2018 creations.

Jean has been invited to attend as speaker at the first edition of the prestigious “High-level Conference on Responsible Management of the Supply Chain in the Garment Sector”, organised in Brussels by the European Commission for Cooperation and International Development.

Her brand is based in Rome, but it is also stocked in specialty boutiques worldwide such as Matches Fashion, The Corner, Moda Operandi, Farfetch, United Arrows, and Alara Lagos.

Laboratorio delle Nazioni (LDN)
Stella Jean has built the business model and sustainable development platform entitled “Laboratorio delle Nazioni." It focuses on what occurs when fashion becomes a tool for cooperative international development.
Through missions on the field, each SJ collection is the result of the construction of a cultural bridge between Italian design and the women artisans of a developing country during each different season.
An international cooperation between Jean's aesthetic and the artisans of developing countries is an ever present staple of her designs, which aim to promote cultural heritage as an enabler and a driver of sustainable development. Despite the thousands of miles of distance that may lie between them, countless hands of women artisans in different countries work together in an ideal Laboratory of Nations, with the common goal of caring and preserving an endangered global cultural heritage. In so doing, these women are building their own economic autonomy, preserving their own traditions, and at the same time gaining a small seat at the global market table.

Jean's past LDN missions have included Peru, Haiti, Burkina Faso, Benin, Mali, Pakistan and others expeditions in South America, Africa and Asia.

In December 2021 Stella Jean was appointed United Nations Goodwill Ambassador in recognition of her work with UN Mountain Partnership women artisans.

 BLM 
Stella Jean is the first and only Italian fashion designer to take to the stage at a BLM protest in June 2020 and to, in her own words, publicly denounce the existence of racial discrimination within the country of Italy.

In 2023, Jean announced that she would be withdrawing from the Milan Fashion Week and participating in a hunger strike due to the lack of diversity and inclusion of designers of color. Jean is not the only one withdrawing from the week.

We Are Made in Italy initiative
In 2021, the We Are Made In Italy'' (WAMI)movement was founded by Jean, and co-founded by Edward Buchanan and Michelle Francine Ngonmo. For the first time in the history of Italian fashion, the National Chamber of Italian Fashion (CNMI) has set up a work group composed of professionals in the industry of African descent.  It is currently an official work group of the Italian Fashion Council.

The inspiration for this initiate began in July 2020, with the above question posed by Stella Jean, the first and only Afro-descendent member of the Italian Fashion Chamber, regarding the lack of the presence of designers of African descent in Italian fashion. In the months that followed, which were intense with dialogue and discussion, a team was built, and with determination and strength, it has provided material for reflection, solutions and projects for the sector as well as for the social fabric of the country. The initiatives focus is to help create opportunities for minorities in the Italian fashion industry, as well as with developing programming to help foster equity and inclusion across the industry.

Cultural influences 
Stella Jean's designs reflect her Creole heritage, and she often works with Haitian and African artisans, incorporating their work into her fashions. Through her use of native craftspeople, she seeks to support struggling countries and communities and preserve their ancestral arts and traditions. She works with industry to generate commercial enterprise and self-sustaining local communities, focusing on women's empowerment. She began her partnership with Ethical Fashion Initiative in 2013 when she extended her reach into a wider range of ethical produced items like bespoke Bogolan (mud-cloth) from Mali and jewelry from Haiti. Stella Jean is a self-taught Italian-Haitian designer. Her desire is to make ethically sound clothes by helping the less advantaged women in the world. By doing so she will be able to create bold and colorful clothing inside and out. Her designs have been worn by celebrities like Rihanna , Beyoncé, Zendaya, Viola Davis, Julia Roberts, Sandra Bullock, Gwyneth Paltrow, Selena Gomez. She uses her mother's maiden name for her brand.

Personal life 
Jean is a mother of two, and resides in Rome with her children.

References

External links 
 Official website
 https://wsimag.com/it/moda/57894-an-italian-pakistan-bridge
 https://www.nytimes.com/2019/09/22/style/trends-shoes-handbags-milan-fashion-week.html?searchResultPosition=1
 https://www.marieclaire.fr/avec-stella-jean-et-yoox-la-mode-prend-de-la-hauteur,1324624.asp
 https://www.forbes.com/sites/liviahengel/2019/06/25/how-this-haitian-italian-designer-takes-local-fashion-global/#50cbc2f26b2e 
https://bazaar.ru/fashion/geroi/dizayner-stella-zhan-i-prezident-yoox-paolo-masio-o-sovmestnoy-kollekcii-otvetstvennoy-mode-i-grete-tunberg/
 Business of Fashion
 http://ethicalfashioninitiative.org/partners/stella-jean/

1979 births
Living people
Fashion designers from Rome
Italian fashion designers
Italian women fashion designers
Italian women company founders
Italian people of Haitian descent
Sapienza University of Rome alumni